Babbit and Catsello are fictional characters, based on the comedic duo Abbott and Costello, that appeared in Warner Bros. animated cartoons. The characters appeared in three cartoons between 1942 and 1946.

Overview
Although the short, fat character calls the other one "Babbit", the tall, skinny one never addresses his partner by name; the name "Catsello" for the short, fat character was invented later. In their first three cartoons, Babbit was voiced by Tedd Pierce, and Mel Blanc performed Catsello.

Appearances

A Tale of Two Kitties

Originally, the pair were cats in pursuit of a small bird for their meal in the 1942 Bob Clampett-directed cartoon A Tale of Two Kitties, a cartoon notable for the first appearance of the bird character who would eventually become Warner Bros. cartoon icon Tweety. The hapless duo fail in every attempt to capture the bird, establishing the pattern that would be used time and again in future Tweety cartoons.

Tale of Two Mice

Three years later, Babbit and Catsello reappeared in the similarly-named A Tale of Two Mice, directed by Frank Tashlin. Though their characterizations were the same, the two were now mice, living in a hole in the wall of a typical cartoon kitchen.

Their goal in this cartoon was the cheese in the kitchen's refrigerator, the only obstacle being the resident house cat. Babbit attempts to coerce Catsello (often by beating him up) into going after the cheese solo, using various methods to get it (which involved Catsello getting hurt). However, in the end, it is Swiss cheese, which Babbit can't stand. Angrily, Catsello beats him up and begins force-feeding the cheese, uttering one of his archetype Lou Costello's famous lines: "Oh — I'm a baaaaad boy!" (At one point in A Tale of Two Kitties, he similarly remarks, "I'm a baaaaad pussycat!")

Hollywood Canine Canteen

They make a cameo in 1946's Hollywood Canine Canteen as the pet dogs of the real life Abbott and Costello (Costello's dog even refers to Abbott's dog as "Babbit").

The Mouse-Merized Cat

Finally, in 1946, they appeared in Robert McKimson's The Mouse-Merized Cat, wherein Babbit uses a book to hypnotize Catsello. Babbit has Catsello believe he's a dog in order to scare off the cat so they can get to the food in the refrigerator. However, the cat soon studies hypnosis and is able to reverse Babbit's spell. This results in Catsello running back and forth between the two as they continue using hypnosis. Finally, Catsello hypnotizes Babbit and the cat into believing they are, respectively, a cowboy and his horse. Catsello tricks  Babbit with his Yosemite Sam-like voice before he and the cat gallop away.

The final scene shows Catsello eating cheese and reading a book on living alone, before turning to the audience and once again reciting "Oh — I'm a baaaaad boy!"

Later appearances
The pair have mainly made cameos in modern Warner Bros. animated projects, their most major appearance being in "Ice Cat-Pades", a segment of the 1995–2000 series The Sylvester & Tweety Mysteries. They both are also playable characters in the video game Looney Tunes World of Mayhem.

References

External links
 Babbit and Catstello at Toonarific.com

Looney Tunes characters
Fictional cats
Fictional mice and rats
Film characters introduced in 1942
Animation based on real people
Animated duos
Cultural depictions of Abbott and Costello